Congo: Descent Into Zinj is a 1995 sci-fi adventure game by Viacom New Media.

References

External links

1995 video games
Adventure games
Classic Mac OS games
Science fiction video games
Single-player video games
Video games about primates
Video games based on films
Video games developed in the United States
Video games set in the Democratic Republic of the Congo
Windows games